The athletics competition at the 2007 All-Africa Games was held on the Stade 5 Juillet 1962 in Algiers, Algeria between 18 July and 22 July 2007. Nigeria was the most successful nation of the competition having won nine golds and 24 medals in total. South Africa was a close second with seven golds and also a total of 24 medals overall. Tunisia and Botswana were the next most successful (both with five golds), although Ethiopia and Kenya had greater medal hauls.

Men's results

Track

Field

Women's results

Track

Field

Medal table

Participating nations

References

Results
Results
Results
All-Africa Games - GBR Athletics

Daily reports

 
Athletics
All-Africa Games
2007
2007 All-Africa Games